The 1987 Arab Club Champions Cup was played in Saudi Arabia for the second time. This time in the city of Riyadh after the successful hosting of the 1984 Arab Club Champions Cup in Dammam. Al-Rasheed won the championship for the 3rd time, defending their championship once again and proving to be one of the top teams in the region at the time.

Participants

Preliminary round
A preliminary stage was held for sides in Africa and Asia with the finals changing into two groups with winners and runners up advancing to the semi finals stage.

Zone 1 (Gulf Area)

Al-Arabi advanced to the final tournament.

Zone 2 (Red Sea)

Tersana and Al-Hilal advanced to the final tournament.

Zone 3 (North Africa)
Preliminary round tournament held in Casablanca, Morocco.

ES Sahel and JE Tizi Ouzou advanced to the final tournament.

Zone 4 (East Region)

Preliminary round tournament held in Amman, Jordan from 18 to 26 July.

Al-Jaish and Palestine SC advanced to the final tournament.

Final tournament

Group stage

Group A

Group B

Knockout stage

Semi finals

3rd Place Match

Final

Winners

Goalscorers

Awards

References

External links
5th Arab Club Champions Cup 1987 - rsssf.com

Arab Champions League, 2006-07
Arab Champions League, 2007-08
1987
International club association football competitions hosted by Saudi Arabia